Lars Saugstad (born 28 May 1997) is a Norwegian former cyclist, who competed as a professional from 2017 to 2022 for UCI ProTeam .

Major results
2018
 6th Paris–Tours Espoirs
 7th Overall Olympia's Tour
2019
 5th Paris–Tours Espoirs
2021
 6th Gylne Gutuer

References

External links

1997 births
Living people
Norwegian male cyclists
People from Ringsaker
Sportspeople from Innlandet